Consciousness! is an album by saxophonist Eric Kloss which was recorded in 1970 and released on the Prestige label.

Reception

AllMusic awarded the album 4½ stars.

Track listing 
All compositions by Eric Kloss, except where indicated.
 "Sunshine Superman" (Donovan) – 10:14  
 "Kay" – 10:24  
 "Outward Wisdom" (Pat Martino) – 6:05  
 "Songs to Aging Children" (Joni Mitchell) – 6:58  
 "Consciousness" (Danny DePaola, Eric Kloss) – 8:36

Personnel 
Eric Kloss – alto saxophone, tenor saxophone
Chick Corea – piano, electric piano 
Pat Martino – guitar
Dave Holland – bass
Jack DeJohnette – drums

References 

1970 albums
Eric Kloss albums
Prestige Records albums
Albums produced by Don Schlitten